Vyksa is a town in Nizhny Novgorod Oblast, Russia, located on the Oka River  southwest of Nizhny Novgorod. Population:

History
Vyksa was founded in 1765 and was granted town status in 1934.

Etymology
From a substrate Finno-Ugric language (cf.  'flow').

Administrative and municipal status
Within the framework of administrative divisions, it is, together with four work settlements and forty-three rural localities, incorporated as the town of oblast significance of Vyksa—an administrative unit with the status equal to that of the districts. As a municipal division, the town of oblast significance of Vyksa is incorporated as Vyksa Urban Okrug.

References

Notes

Sources

External links
Interactive map of Vyksa 
Vyksa Steel Works 
Pictures of Vyksa
Vyksa news
Virtual Book about Vyksa
Virtual Vyksa
Video about Nizhny Novgorod Oblast and Vyksa 

Cities and towns in Nizhny Novgorod Oblast
Populated places established in 1765
Vyksa Urban Okrug
Ardatovsky Uyezd (Nizhny Novgorod Governorate)
Lattice shell structures by Vladimir Shukhov
Articles containing video clips